The 2004 Fed Cup was the 42nd edition of the most important competition between national teams in women's tennis.

The final was held at the Ice Palace Krylatskoye in Moscow, Russia, on 27–28 November. The home team Russia defeated the defending champion France to win their first title after five final appearances.

World Group

Draw

World Group play-offs

Date: 10–11 July

The eight losing teams in the World Group first round ties and eight winners of the Zonal Group I sections competed in the World Group play-offs for spots in the 2005 World Group II.

Americas Zone

 Nations in bold advanced to the higher level of competition.
 Nations in italics were relegated down to a lower level of competition.

Group I
Venue: Porto Seguro, Bahia, Brazil (outdoor clay)

Dates: 19–24 April

Participating Teams

Group II
Venue: Porto Seguro, Bahia, Brazil (outdoor clay)

Dates: 19–24 April

Participating Teams

Asia/Oceania Zone

 Nations in bold advanced to the higher level of competition.
 Nations in italics were relegated down to a lower level of competition.

Group I
Venue: New Delhi, India (outdoor hard)

Dates: 19–24 April

Participating Teams

Group II
Venue: New Delhi, India (outdoor hard)

Dates: 19–24 April

Participating Teams

 
 Pacific Oceania

Europe/Africa Zone

Group I
Venue: Athens, Greece (outdoor clay)

Dates: 19–24 April

Participating Teams

Group II
Venue: Marsa, Malta (outdoor hard)

Dates: 26 April – 1 May

Participating Teams

Group III
Venue: Marsa, Malta (outdoor hard)

Dates: 26 April – 1 May

Participating Teams

Rankings
The rankings were measured after the three points during the year that play took place, and were collated by combining points earned from the previous four years.

References

External links 
 Fed Cup

 
Billie Jean King Cups by year
Fed
2004 in women's tennis
November 2004 sports events in Russia